Starkovia is a genus of mites in the family Laelaptonyssidae. There are about eight described species in Starkovia, some of which were transferred from the genus Laelaptonyssus when it was determined to be a synonym of Starkovia.

Species
These eight species belong to the genus Starkovia:
 Starkovia chinensis (Samšinák, 1964)
 Starkovia darwiniensis (Halliday, 1987)
 Starkovia hallidayi (Krantz, 2000)
 Starkovia lacticolus (Halliday, 2006)
 Starkovia lenzi (Halliday, 1987)
 Starkovia mitis (Womersley, 1956)
 Starkovia setosus (Krantz, 2000)
 Starkovia termitophila Lombardini, 1947

References

Acari